Rachel Banham (born July 15, 1993, in Minneapolis, Minnesota) is an American former professional basketball player. Banham played guard for the Minnesota Golden Gophers women's basketball team, where she set a number of team records. Banham was drafted by the Connecticut Sun with the 4th pick of the 2016 WNBA draft.  Banham was traded to the Minnesota Lynx on February 25, 2020. It was also announced on January 2, 2022, on social media that she and her boyfriend Andre Hollins were engaged at Williams Arena.

High school career
Banham went to Lakeville North High School in Lakeville, Minnesota and graduated in 2011. She started on the varsity basketball team as an 8th grade student. During her senior year, she averaged 17.8 points per game, 5.3 rebounds, and four assists. With these numbers she led her squad to a 29–3 record and a conference championship.

College career
After graduating from high school, Banham continued her education and basketball career at the University of Minnesota. Banham started all 36 games her freshman year, and was named Freshman All American First Team and Big Ten Freshman of the Year. During her freshman year, (2011-2012) she averaged 16.1 points per game which ranked her 97th in the nation. Her sophomore year (2012-2013) she was averaged 20.7 points per game which was good enough for second-leading sophomore scorer in NCAA division 1. As a Junior (2013-2014) she averaged 22.1 points, 3.7 rebounds, and 3.9 assists per game. At the start of her senior season (2014-2015) Banham had only played 10 games before she suffered a season ending ACL injury. Before she had torn her ACL she was on ESPN's top 5 players to watch in the upcoming season. She later received a medical hardship waiver so she could play in the 2015–2016 season. When she returned to the court in the 2015–2016 season for her senior year she had an outstanding season. She was named Big Ten Player of the Year and was a John R. Wooden Award finalist. Despite her time off because of her injury, Banham came back to become the Gophers all-time leading scorer and tied an NCAA record with a 60-point game against Northwestern.  Banham ended her college career on a high note, becoming the sixth-leading scorer in NCAA Division I women's history and the Big Ten Conference's all-time scoring leader at the end of her college career with 3,093 points. (As of the end of the 2017–18 season, she is now eighth on the career scoring list, having since been surpassed by Washington's Kelsey Plum (2013–17), now the D-I all-time scoring leader, and new Big Ten career scoring leader Kelsey Mitchell of Ohio State (2015–18).) Banham's senior year was not only one of the most memorable seasons in Gopher basketball history, but NCAA basketball history as well.

College statistics

Source

WNBA

Connecticut Sun
Banham was selected 4th overall by the Connecticut Sun in the 2016 WNBA Draft. During her rookie season with the Sun, Banham played in 15 games and averaged 10.9 minutes, 3.7 points, 1 assist, 1 rebound, while shooting 41% from the field and 35% from 3-point distance. Ultimately her rookie year was cut short after she tore her MCL and had micro fracture surgery on July 10.
Banham's best year with the Sun came in 2018 when she averaged a career high 5.2 points. During the rest of her time in Connecticut, she did not get much playing time as she only averaged 11.4 minutes, 4 points, 1 assist and 1 rebound a game in her first four seasons with the Sun.

Minnesota Lynx
On February 25, 2020, Banham was acquired by the Minnesota Lynx in a sign and trade deal that send a 2021 2nd Round Pick to the Sun. During the 2020 Bubble Season in Bradenton, she showed some improvements averaging multiple career highs – 17.4 minutes, 6.9 points, 2.4 assists and 1.3 rebounds a game. She had her best game as a professional against the Indiana Fever on September 12, when she scored a career high 29 points and 10 assists, while making 7 3 pointers.

The 2021 season saw a change for Banham as her role decreased as the team signed Kayla McBride, Natalie Achonwa & Aerial Powers during the offseason. On June 29, Banham was waived from the Lynx in order to clear some salary cap space for Minnesota. After clearing waivers, the Lynx re-signed Banham to a rest of season deal on July 5 – allowing her to re-join the team.

WNBA career statistics

Regular season

|-
| align="left" | 2016
| align="left" | Connecticut
| 15 || 0 || 10.9 || .408 || .351 || .667 || 0.7 || 0.9 || 0.5 || 0.1 || 0.5 || 3.7
|-
| align="left" | 2017
| align="left" | Connecticut
| 30 || 0 || 9.4 || .327 || .281 || .800 || 1.1 || 0.7 || 0.1 || 0.0 || 0.4 || 3.3
|-
| align="left" | 2018
| align="left" | Connecticut
| 33 || 5 || 12.8 || .414 || .370 || .868 || 0.9 || 1.5 || 0.5 || 0.1 || 0.5 || 5.2
|-
| align="left" | 2019
| align="left" | Connecticut
| 29 || 0 || 12.2 || .322 || .306 || .692 || 1.0 || 0.9 || 0.3 || 0.1 || 0.9 || 3.6
|-
| align="left" | 2020
| align="left" | Minnesota
| 20 || 1 || 17.0 || .462 || .472 || .800 || 1.3 || 2.4 || 0.5 || 0.1 || 1.0 || 6.9
|-
| align="left" | 2021
| align="left" | Minnesota
| 27 || 0 || 12.6 || .395 || .373 || .625 || 1.2 || 1.6 || 0.3 || 0.1 || 0.9 || 5.0
|-
| align="left" | 2022
| align="left" | Minnesota
| 36 || 5 || 17.5 || .430 || .383 || .800 || 1.3 || 2.3 || 0.3 || 0.1 || 1.3 || 7.9
|-
| align="left" | Career
| align="left" | 7 years, 2 teams
| 190 || 11 || 13.3 || .398 || .365 || .795 || 1.1 || 1.5 || 0.3 || 0.1 || 0.8 || 5.2

Postseason

|-
| align="left" | 2017
| align="left" | Connecticut
| 1 || 0 || 2.0 || 1.000 || 1.000 || .000 || 0.0 || 0.0 || 0.0 || 0.0 || 0.0 || 3.0
|-
| align="left" | 2018
| align="left" | Connecticut
| 1 || 0 || 9.0 || .250 || 1.000 || .000 || 1.0 || 2.0 || 1.0 || 1.0 || 0.0 || 3.0
|-
| align="left" | 2019
| align="left" | Connecticut
| 4 || 0 || 6.0 || .375 || .600 || 1.000 || 0.8 || 0.0 || 0.0 || 0.3 || 0.3 || 2.8
|-
| align="left" | 2020
| align="left" | Minnesota
| 4 || 0 || 18.8 || .310 || .333 || 1.000 || 1.5 || 1.8 || 0.0 || 0.3 || 1.3 || 5.8
|-
| align="left" | 2021
| align="left" | Minnesota
| 1 || 0 || 5.0 || .000 || .000 || 1.000 || 1.0 || 0.9 || 0.1 || 0.3 || 0.7 || 2.0
|-
| align="left" | Career
| align="left" |5 years, 2 teams
| 11 || 0 || 10.5 || .318 || .474 || 1.000 || 1.0 || 0.9 || 0.1 || 0.3 || 0.6 || 3.8

See also
List of NCAA Division I women's basketball career scoring leaders
List of NCAA Division I women's basketball season scoring leaders

References

External sources
Minnesota Golden Gophers bio
ESPN profile
Thoughts about Rachel at gophersports.com

1993 births
Living people
All-American college women's basketball players
American women's basketball players
Basketball players from Minnesota
Big Ten Athlete of the Year winners
Connecticut Sun draft picks
Connecticut Sun players
Minnesota Golden Gophers women's basketball players
Minnesota Lynx players
People from Lakeville, Minnesota
Point guards